Juniper Beach Provincial Park is a provincial park in British Columbia, Canada. It is located on the north side of the Thompson River west of the town of Savona, downstream of the outflow of Kamloops Lake. The park was established in 1989, and protects dry sagebrush and desert ecology.

Fauna
Fish species in the Thompson River include trout, steelhead, and salmon. The dry sagebrush areas of the park are home to Western Rattlesnakes and deer. The area  attracts many species of birds, including the Western Tanager, Mountain Bluebird and the Northern Oriole.

References

Provincial parks of British Columbia
Thompson Country
1989 establishments in British Columbia
Protected areas established in 1989